Jewells may refer to:
Jewell (disambiguation)
Jewells, New South Wales, Australia
Jewells, California, former name of Jewell, California, United States